Plattenspitze or Plattenspitz may refer to the following mountains in central Europe:

 Plattenspitz in the canton of St. Gallen, Switzerland
 Plattenspitze (Allgäu Alps) in the Hornbach chain of the Allgäu Alps, Tyrol, Austria
 Plattenspitze (Karwendel) in the Karwendel mountains, Tyrol, Austria
 Plattenspitze (Schladming Tauern) in the Schladming Tauern, Salzburg, Austria
 Plattenspitze (Ortler Alps) in the Ortler Alps, South Tyrol, Italy

See also
 Plattspitzen